WLZK (94.1 FM) is a radio station broadcasting a hot adult contemporary format. Licensed to Paris, Tennessee, United States, the station serves the Jackson TN area. The station is currently owned by Forever Media, through licensee Forever South Licenses, LLC, and features programming from Jones Radio Network.

History
The station went on the air as WMUF-FM on 1991-04-10. On 1997-06-09, the station changed its call sign to the current WLZK.

References

External links

LZK
Hot adult contemporary radio stations in the United States